Your Black Muslim Bakery (YBMB) was an American chain of bakeries opened by Yusuf Bey in 1968 in Santa Barbara, California, and relocated to Oakland in 1971. A power broker at the center of a local community, YBMB was held out as a model of African American economic self-sufficiency. However, it was later linked to widespread physical and sexual abuse, welfare fraud, and murder. 

After Bey's death in 2003, YBMB fell into debt and declared Chapter 11 bankruptcy in October 2006. In August 2007, in connection with investigations into the murder of Oakland Post journalist Chauncey Bailey and a number of other crimes, police conducted a massive raid on the company's San Pablo Avenue bakery. A concurrent health inspection resulted in its closure. Later that day, a court ordered the pending reorganization converted into a liquidation bankruptcy.

Origins

Yusuf Bey, born Joseph Stephens, came to Oakland, California, with his family from Texas in the early 1950s. He later opened beauty salons in the San Francisco Bay Area and in southern California, before going into the bakery business. After discovering the teachings of Elijah Muhammad in the 1960s, Bey converted to the Nation of Islam (NOI) in 1964 and founded the "Islamic" bakery in Santa Barbara in 1968. The bakery was not officially affiliated with the NOI and not representative of mainstream Muslim cultures. NOI minister Keith Muhammad, of East Oakland's Muhammad Mosque #26, stated that the two organizations were distinct and separate.

Bey named the business Your Black Muslim Bakery (YBMB) on the personal recommendation of Elijah Muhammad, who had become his spiritual guide. In 1971, Bey moved the bakery to Oakland. By 1974 it was the "largest Bay Area bakery specializing exclusively in natural food products", with over 6,000 loaves of bread and over 300 cakes per week sold at 150 stores.

During the mid-1980s, Bey appeared regularly on a local Oakland cable television lecture program, True Solutions, during which he broadcast his hour-long sermons every week. On the program Bey also promoted the bakery, and frequently expounded on the need for the economic self-reliance and "knowledge of self" of African Americans, whom he lectured the audience as being the "Original Man", a racially-charged idea derived from the NOI's doctrine of Yakub. By the 1990s, YBMB and its leaders were a respected part of Oakland society, and had substantial influence in local politics. They used their power to obtain favors from the city, influence local elections, and avoid scrutiny from police. Bey ran unsuccessfully for mayor in 1994, gaining 5% of the vote.

By 2007, the company was headquartered at 5832 San Pablo Avenue, with five branch locations listed in Alameda County records, including a store on Telegraph Avenue in Oakland's Temescal district and another at Oakland International Airport. The bakery also had a location at the Oakland Coliseum.

Yusuf Bey era controversies

Akbar Bey

In 1994, Bey's son Akbar was shot four times and killed by a local drug dealer outside the Omni nightclub near the corner of Shattuck Avenue and 50th Street in Oakland. Court records showed the pathologist's conclusion that Akbar was high on heroin or morphine at the time of his death. Three months before his killing, Akbar had been charged with felony counts of carrying a concealed weapon and evading the police, resulting in a car chase and crash at 44th Street and Market Street.

1994 Nedir and Abaz Bey trial
On March 4, 1994, Nedir Bey was involved in the torture and beating of a Nigerian home-seller in an apartment on the 500 block of 24th Street in Oakland, involving a real estate deal. The apartment complex served as a compound for the Bey organization. The extremely violent incident also involved Abaz Bey. Both Abaz and Nedir were standing members of the African-American Advisory Committee on Crime, which also included Oakland's then-mayor Elihu Harris. The committee had organized a massive conference on crime that same weekend, featuring Jesse Jackson as its keynote speaker.

The assault escalated into a massive incident in which ninety Oakland Police officers were engaged in hand-to-hand combat with thirty Black Muslims, some of whom were armed. The two Beys and two other men were charged with felony counts of assault, robbery, and false imprisonment. A year later, all four men pleaded no contest to one felony count of false imprisonment. The prosecutors had cut a plea deal, in part because they could take testimony from any tenant witnesses at the apartment complex where the Bey organization stationed its members as security, like a private compound. Nedir Bey served six months of home detention, and Abaz Bey got eight months' home detention.

1996 City loan
In 1996, the City of Oakland loaned YBMB $1.1 million to start a home health care business. The loan was never repaid, and the home health care business never was established.

Yusuf Bey rape trial
Bey's detractors—notably East Bay Express journalist Chris Thompson—accused him of cultism, corruption, and antisemitism. Many accusations of physical and sexual abuse, including rape and incest, and which were sustained by DNA evidence, were made against Bey, culminating in felony charges which were pending at the time of his death.

On September 19, 2002, Bey turned himself in to Oakland Police when a warrant was issued for his arrest, charged with 27 counts in the alleged rapes of four girls under the age of 14. The cases were pending trial into the following year. The oldest allegation was that, beginning twenty years earlier, he serially raped through coercion a preteen girl who, as a ten-year-old, came under foster care of Bey and his wife Nora. Bey died of cancer in October 2003 at age 67 while the first case was awaiting trial.

Second-generation controversies

Waajid Bey

Following the death of Yusuf Bey in 2003, Waajid Aliawaad Bey became chief executive officer of YBMB. In March 2004, at age 51, Waajid disappeared for several months, until the discovery of his badly decomposed body in a shallow grave off Skyline Blvd. in the Oakland Hills. He was determined to be the victim of a homicide.

Antar Bey 
YBMB was then taken over by Yusuf Bey's son, Antar Bey. At age 23 on October 25, 2005, Antar was in turn shot to death in what police believe to have been a failed carjacking while he was stopped to get gas on Martin Luther King Jr. Way, near 55th Street. On December 14, 2007, Alfonza Phillips III was sentenced to life imprisonment for his murder. Another son, Yusuf Bey IV, took over YBMB in October 2005.

Yusuf Bey IV 
In November 2005, two liquor stores in Oakland were vandalized, one of which was captured on a store surveillance tape. Another store was burned, and a store owner was briefly abducted by men wearing the distinctive bow-tie apparel associated with the NOI. The men had demanded that the stores stop selling alcohol to African Americans. Yusuf Bey IV was among those arrested in the case, and he was charged with having led the attacks.

In February 2006, in nearby Vallejo, Yusuf IV was arrested and later found guilty of a number of crimes related to his scheme to buy a $55,000 luxury Mercedes-Benz from a used-car lot by using false credit information and identification. He was also charged with trying to open a bank account with the false information. Vallejo police dropped charges concerning a 9mm pistol and ammunition which had been found in the car.

Yusuf IV was arrested in San Francisco on assault charges in April 2006, after allegedly trying to run down three security guards outside a strip club in his BMW, after he had been thrown out. Then he was charged with missing several court dates, for which he became wanted on a $375,000 warrant. According to later court documents, he also used a stolen identification with a fake driver's license to fraudulently obtain favorable credit to buy a house in the 2500 block of 61st Avenue. Yusuf IV signed all the documents with the name Yasir Human. The US$550,000 loan was through CIT Group/Consumer Finance Inc.

Sayyed Yusuf Bey 

Sayyed Yusuf "Weedy" Bey was one of the elder Yusuf Bey's older sons. After graduating from the Elijah Education Center in 1994, he joined the True Solutions production team as a camera operator and worked as a baker at YBMB. Sayyed also had a minor role in the 1998 feature film Drylongso. That year, he also moved to Los Angeles to pursue his passion of exotic automobiles and became the owner of Quick N Shine Auto Detail, working with celebrities such as the Wayans family. On February 24, 2009, Sayyed took his own life on Burnside Ave, Los Angeles. Due to Yusuf IV's pending murder trial, the Bey family didn't publish any obituary notices in Los Angeles.

2006 bankruptcy 
On October 24, 2006, YBMB filed for Chapter 11 bankruptcy. With $900,000 in debts, owed mostly to the mortgage holder, the bakery building was about to be foreclosed upon. The remaining debt, $200,000, was owed to the Internal Revenue Service (IRS). The day after the murder of Chauncey Bailey, on August 3, 2007, Judge Edward Jellen ordered the case to be converted to Chapter 7 liquidation effective August 9.

Political fallout 
It was revealed that three local prominent elected officials wrote letters in July 2007 to Judge Jellen asking him not to dissolve YBMB to pay off creditors. Congresswoman Barbara Lee, Oakland Mayor Ron Dellums, and California Assemblyman Sandré Swanson all wrote letters at the request of longtime YBMB associate Ali Saleem Bey. Lee later expressed regret for her support. Dellums' office offered the explanation that Ali said that he hoped to gain control of YBMB, and return it to its historical roots. Swanson's letter was dated July 17, 2007 and his office first admitted to having "made a mistake", and also stated that Swanson was not aware of the bakery leaders' legal problems. However, later Swanson's office stated that the letter was a routine response to a routine request such as they receive from small businesses, and that the earlier statement did not represent the official position of the assemblyman.

Elmhurst-East Oakland City Council member Larry Reid said that he had refused the request by Bey to write a similar letter of support for YBMB in July, because the bakery had failed to repay the 1996 loan and because of the well-publicized criminal charges that had been brought against Bey organization leaders by that time, including the 2005 liquor store incidents. Reid said he respects the old guard of the bakery represented by John and Ali Bey, but that was not enough.

2006 Health Code violations 
On December 19, 2006, YBMB's San Pablo Avenue bakery headquarters received four "major" health code violations, with dangerously unsanitary conditions, during a restaurant inspection by the Alameda County Environmental Health Department. The conditions were grave enough to risk immediate closure, if not fixed immediately, according to department policy. However, the bakery remained open, and no follow-up inspection was recorded by the department. The major violations included issues with grease, lack of smooth and cleanable surfaces, lack of adequate stove hood venting, and inadequate lighting. In addition inspectors cited four minor violations involving employee behavior and cleanliness.

May 2007 kidnapping 
Oakland Police say that three men associated with YBMB, including Yusuf IV, later confessed to a May 17, 2007 kidnapping of two women, a mother and daughter, and tortured the latter. According to court records and a police affidavit, 20-year-old Joshua Bey and 21-year-old Tamon Oshun Halfin staked out the women at a bingo parlor at Foothill Square in East Oakland. Halfin and Joshua admitted that Yusuf IV ordered them to keep watch, and to notify him when the two women left. The men believed that both the women and a male friend had a lot of cash, which the Beys and Halfin were trying to get for the bakery.

Joshua and Halfin were riding in a fake police car, with flashing lights, which was registered to Yusuf IV. The car pulled the women over on Interstate 580. Wearing dark clothing and masks, the two men took the women at gunpoint into the fake police car. A third man was behind the wheel. The men covered the women's heads and drove off, while the third man followed them, driving the women's car. They ended up at a house in the 6800 block of Avenal Avenue, a couple miles from the bingo parlor. Police said that YBMB owned the house as a rental. The mother was left inside the car while the daughter was taken inside the house, where she was tortured, hit in the head and knee with a hard object, and was threatened with being set on fire. An Oakland Police officer in the area that night, looking for a stolen car, spotted the fake police car with the mother inside and, when he stopped to investigate, the men fled the house. The daughter broke a window of the house and called for help, and the mother was then found by police unharmed. A cell phone found in the house belonged to Joshua.

Joshua and Halfin were later among those arrested in the raid on the bakery. Police later held Yusuf IV without bail for kidnapping for ransom in the case.

July 2007 double homicide 
The later YBMB investigation and arrests may also relate to a double homicide that occurred near the bakery a couple months after the May kidnappings. On July 8, 2007, one victim was killed in the 1000 block of 60th Street. Then on July 12, 2007, another victim, Mike Wills Jr., was gunned down in the 6200 block of San Pablo Avenue. On August 6, the police, without filing charges, stated that the two murders were committed with an AK-47 found at the bakery during the August raid. Devaughndre Broussard said Antoine Mackey killed Wills because he was white, and Mackey and Bey had been inspired by the racially motivated Zebra murders.

July 2007 kidnapping 
Another case linked to arrestees in the later YBMB raid involved yet another kidnapping on July 19, 2007 of some women for ransom, before they escaped their captors.

Murder of Chauncey Bailey 

Before his shooting death in August 2007, editor Chauncey Bailey of the Oakland Post was working on a story about the finances of YBMB, involving its pending bankruptcy. Ali Saleem Bey was Bailey's source for the story, which the Post withheld on the belief that it was not yet ready for publication. 

According to Ali, YBMB had been seized from its rightful heirs in a coup, through fraud and forgery, by a younger branch of the family, that included Antar Bey and Yusef Bey IV. Ali revealed that in June 2005, John Bey, a former head of the Bey security service who had tried to expose the fraud behind the coup, fled Oakland with his family after an attempt on his life in a shooting outside his home. In 2005, Antar mortgaged the bakery property, to cover back taxes and other debt, and then defaulted, which led to threat of foreclosure.

On the morning of August 2, 2007, Bailey was murdered in Downtown Oakland by Devaughndre Broussard, a 19-year-old YBMB handyman who was on probation for a San Francisco robbery conviction, had found out where Bailey lived. At 7:25 a.m. Broussard spotted Bailey leaving a McDonald's restaurant where Bailey regularly stopped to eat breakfast. Wearing a ski mask and dark clothing, he then got out of a parked Ford Aerostar and approached Bailey with a Mossberg shotgun. Broussard's first blast hit Bailey in the chest, after which he stood over him and fired at his face execution style, and then fired a coup de grâce to make sure he was dead. He then escaped in the van.

Broussard admitted to police the next night that he then ambushed and killed Bailey. Oakland Police investigators said that he confessed to the murder because he was angry over the past and ongoing articles written by Bailey about YBMB and its personnel.

Closure of bakery and conviction 
The Alameda County Health Department closed YBMB after rat droppings were found inside the bakery and dead rats found on the rooftop, along with other waste which was leaking into drainage lines. As a result, police officers called in Oakland's Vector Control during the raid, along with the state of California Department of Fish and Game and the Alameda Country District Attorney's Office environmental crimes unit. Pending fines could have reached up to $5,000 per day.

On August 4, 2007, Broussard was booked on suspicion of murder for the killing of Bailey, having told police detectives that he considered himself "a good soldier." Yusuf IV was also arrested that day on the outstanding San Francisco warrant, and held without bail in the May kidnapping-for-ransom case. His brother Joshua, Halfin and one of the other arrestees from the morning prior were being held in connection with the earlier kidnappings, including the assault of the one woman in May.

On August 7, Broussard was arraigned in Alameda County Superior Court for Bailey's murder, and also charged with being a convicted felon in possession of a firearm and with having a prior felony conviction from San Francisco. In August 2011, he was sentenced to 25 years in state prison. On June 11, 2011, Yusuf IV was convicted on three counts of first-degree murder and sentenced to life in prison. In 2015, a state appeals court upheld the convictions of Yusuf Bey IV and Antoine Mackey.

See also 
 Yusuf Bey
 Chauncey Bailey

References

External links
Your Black Muslim Bakery, last version of home page available at archive.org
Yusuf Bey Obituary in the San Francisco Chronicle, October 2, 2003
Blood & Money: Endgame—commentary in the East Bay Express, October 8, 2003
Two men arrested in liquor store vandalism case -- San Francisco Chronicle, November 29, 2005
7 Arrested in Death of Oakland Newspaper Editor -- New York Times, August 4, 2007

African-American history in Oakland, California
African-American restaurants
Black-owned companies of the United States
Companies based in Oakland, California
Food and drink in the San Francisco Bay Area
Nation of Islam
Crimes in Oakland, California
Defunct companies based in California
Defunct retail companies of the United States
Food and drink companies established in 1968
Companies that have filed for Chapter 7 bankruptcy
Companies that filed for Chapter 11 bankruptcy in 2006
Privately held companies based in California
Politics of Oakland, California
20th century in Oakland, California
2000s in Oakland, California
Bakeries of California
1968 establishments in California
1997 disestablishments in California
Food and drink companies disestablished in 1997